Ryan Davis (born 7 June 1989) is a former professional Australian rules footballer who played for the West Coast Eagles and Gold Coast Football Club in the Australian Football League (AFL).

Biography
He started his senior football career at the North Shore Bombers before catching the eye of West Coast Eagle talent scouts. Signing a scholarship with the club in 2007, Davis had an outstanding year playing first grade for North Shore and the Under 18 NSW state team. After collecting 2nd in the North Shore best and Fairest, best first year player and playing an important part in both a North Shore premiership (in which he won best on ground) and NSW series win Ryan was offered a rookie spot with West Coast for the 2008 season.

Davis made his AFL debut for the West Coast Eagles at Gold Coast Stadium versus North Melbourne in Round 8 of the 2008 AFL season and continued to play 11 games in his debut season. After this he moved to Swan Districts and went on to play in a premiership in 2010 and win a club best and fairest, the Swan Medal in 2014.

After six years out of the AFL, he was recruited by Gold Coast in the 2016 rookie draft.

Davis was delisted by Gold Coast at the conclusion of the 2017 season.

References

External links

1989 births
Living people
Gold Coast Football Club players
West Coast Eagles players
North Shore Australian Football Club players
NSW/ACT Rams players
Australian rules footballers from New South Wales
Swan Districts Football Club players
Southport Australian Football Club players